General elections were held in Nicaragua on 4 November 2001 to elect the President and the members of the National Assembly.  Enrique Bolaños of the Constitutionalist Liberal Party (PLC) was elected president, with Daniel Ortega losing his third successive presidential election. The Constitutionalist Liberal Party also won the parliamentary elections, receiving over half the vote and 52 of the 92 seats.

Results

President

National Assembly

By region

References

Elections in Nicaragua
Nicaragua
2001 in Nicaragua
Presidential elections in Nicaragua
November 2001 events in North America
Election and referendum articles with incomplete results